Ati Kepo (born on 15 January 1996), is a Papua New Guinean professional football player who plays for the Papua New Guinean national team.

He debuted internationally on 18 March 2022 in a 2022 FIFA World Cup qualifying match against New Zealand in a 0–1 defeat.

On 24 March 2022, Kepo scored his first goal for Papua New Guinea against Fiji in a 1–2 victory, advancing his team to the final stage to face the Solomon Islands in which he scored another goal, resulting a 3–2 defeat.

References

1996 births
Living people
Papua New Guinean footballers
Papua New Guinea international footballers
Association football forwards